The 1996 National League Championship Series (NLCS) matched the East Division champion Atlanta Braves and the Central Division champion St. Louis Cardinals. It was the second NLCS meeting of the two teams and first since 1982. The Braves won in seven games, becoming the eighth team in baseball history to win a best-of-seven postseason series after being down 3–1, and first to overcome such a deficit in the NLCS. They outscored the Cardinals, 32–1, over the final three games. Also, Bobby Cox became the only manager to be on both the winning and losing end of such a comeback in postseason history, having previously blown the 1985 American League Championship Series with the Toronto Blue Jays against the Kansas City Royals. 

The Braves would go on to lose to the New York Yankees in the World Series in six games.

Summary

Atlanta Braves vs. St. Louis Cardinals

Game summaries

Game 1
Wednesday, October 9, 1996, at Atlanta–Fulton County Stadium in Atlanta, Georgia

Game 1 was played in Atlanta with 24-game winner John Smoltz on the mound for the Braves versus Andy Benes for the Cardinals. Brian Jordan tripled and scored the first run of the series for St. Louis on a wild pitch in the second, but Mark Lemke singled in two runs in the fifth.  St. Louis tied the game in the seventh on three consecutive leadoff singles by Gary Gaetti, John Mabry and Tom Pagnozzi, but Atlanta catcher Javy López gave Atlanta back the lead for good with a two-run bases-loaded single in the bottom of the eighth off of T.J. Mathews, both runs charged to Mark Petkovsek.  Mark Wohlers got the save after Smoltz threw eight innings. The Braves held on to a 4–2 victory.

Game 2
Thursday, October 10, 1996, at Atlanta–Fulton County Stadium in Atlanta, Georgia

The Braves sent Greg Maddux to the mound versus Todd Stottlemyre looking to go up two games to none on St. Louis. Royce Clayton singled to lead off the top of the first and scored on Ron Gant's one-out single aided by center fielder Marquis Grissom's error. The Cardinals made it 3–0 in the third on back-to-back two-out RBI doubles by Gant and Brian Jordan, but a two-run home run by Marquis Grissom in the bottom of the inning made the score 3–2. The Braves loaded the bases in the sixth on a single and two walks with one out when Ryan Klesko's RBI single tied the game.  In the seventh inning, a throwing error by Chipper Jones on Mark Sweeney's ground ball, single and walked load the bases with no outs for the Cardinals. Ray Lankford's sacrifice fly put them up 4–3 and two outs later, Jordan was intentionally walked to load the bases before Gary Gaetti drove a pitch from Maddux over the fence for a grand slam home run, putting the Cardinals 8–3. Dennis Eckersley pitched the final  innings for the Cardinals and the series was evened at 1–1 as play moved to St. Louis. Only three of the eight runs Maddux allowed were earned.

Game 3
Saturday, October 12, 1996, at Busch Stadium (II) in St. Louis, Missouri

The Braves struck first in Game 3 when Marquis Grissom singled to lead off the first, moved to second on a groundout, then to third on a wild pitch by Donovan Osborne before scoring on Chipper Jones's sacrifice fly, but in the bottom of the inning, Ron Gant's two-run home run off of former teammate Tom Glavine put the Cardinals up 2–1. He also homered in the sixth off of Glavine for the Cardinals' other run. The Braves loaded the bases with no outs on three straight singles off of Osborne and Mark Petkovsek in the seventh, but scored only once on a Jermaine Dye sacrifice fly. They went quietly in the ninth to Dennis Eckersley as St. Louis took a series lead.

Game 4
Sunday, October 13, 1996, at Busch Stadium (II) in St. Louis, Missouri

Needing the win to help stave off an upset, the Braves struck first on a Ryan Klesko home run in the second off of Andy Benes. Mark Lemke's leadoff home run in the sixth made it 2–0 Braves and after Chipper Jones doubled, Tony Fossas relieved Benes and walked Fred McGriff before Klesko grounded into a double play, moving Jones to third. After Javy López was intentionally walked, T.J. Mathews relieved Fossas and allowed an RBI single by Jermaine Dye. Denny Neagle was on the mound for Atlanta and looked sharp until the seventh inning, when he allowed a two-out single and subsequent walk, then Dmitri Young rocketed a pinch-hit triple off of Greg McMichael that scored two runs. After a walk, Royce Clayton singled in the tying run. In the eighth inning, Brian Jordan homered off of Braves reliever Greg McMichael. Down 4–3, the Braves again could not crack Dennis Eckersley, who pitched the final , striking out Terry Pendleton and Marquis Grissom to finish off the Braves.

Game 5
Monday, October 14, 1996, at Busch Stadium (II) in St. Louis, Missouri

With their backs to the wall, the defending champion Braves struck back with a vengeance. The Braves knocked Cardinals starter Todd Stottlemyre out of the game early. In the first, Marquis Grissom hit a leadoff single followed by a Mark Lemke double before both scored on Chipper Jones's double. Jones then scored on Fred McGriff's single. Two outs later, Jermaine Dye singled before Jeff Blauser's two-run triple made it 5–0 Braves. Leading off the next inning, three consecutive singles made it 6–0 Braves and knocked Stottlemyre out of the game. Danny Jackson in relief allowed a two-out RBI single to Ryan Klesko. In the fourth with two on and two outs, consecutive RBI singles by John Smoltz, Grissom, and Lemke made it 10–0 Braves. Javy López's two-out home run next inning off of Tony Fossas made it 11–0 Braves. In the eighth, Lopez doubled with one out and scored on Rafael Belliard's two-out single off of Mark Petkovsek. Fred McGriff's two-run home run in the ninth off of Rick Honeycutt made it 14–0 Braves. Behind 24-game winner John Smoltz and 22 hits (an LCS record), the Braves forced the series to return to Atlanta with Atlanta–Fulton County Stadium still scheduled for demolition over the fall and winter.

Game 6
Wednesday, October 16, 1996, at Atlanta–Fulton County Stadium in Atlanta, Georgia

After his rattling defeat in Game 2, Greg Maddux stepped up in Game 6 and outdueled Cardinals starter Alan Benes to keep Atlanta's comeback hopes alive.  While Maddux mowed down the Cardinals, with some help from a great catch by center fielder Marquis Grissom, the Braves struck first in the second on Jermaine Dye's sacrifice fly with runners on second and third. In the fifth, Jeff Blauser was hit by a pitch, moved to second on a groundout and scored on Mark Lemke's single. A wild pitch by Mark Wohlers led to the Cardinals' only run of the game in the eighth with the run charged to Maddux, but the Braves got the run back in the bottom half on Rafael Belliard's RBI single off of Todd Stottlemyre. Then Wohlers pitched a perfect ninth inning to finish off the Cardinals and to extend the Championship Series to its seventh game.

Game 7
Thursday, October 17, 1996, at Atlanta–Fulton County Stadium in Atlanta, Georgia

The Braves clinched the NLCS with a blowout Game 7 win. In the first with runners on second and third and one out off of Donovan Osborne, Fred McGriff hit into a fielder's choice to score the first run of the game. After a walk, consecutive RBI singles by Jermaine Dye and Andruw Jones made it 3–0 Braves. After Jeff Blauser was hit by a pitch to load the bases, Tom Glavine cleared them with a triple, knocking Osborne out of the game while Glavine pitched seven innings, allowing only three hits. In the fourth, Andy Benes walked two straight batters with one out before McGriff drove them both in with a single aided by an error, then Javy López's home run made it 10–0 Braves. McGriff tripled to lead off the sixth off of Mark Petkovsek, then scored on Lopez's double before Jones's one-out home run made it 13–0 Braves. McGriff's two-run home run in the seventh off of Rick Honeycutt capped the scoring at 15–0 Braves. Mike Bielecki and Steve Avery pitched scoreless eighth and ninth innings, respectively as the Braves advanced to the World Series for the second straight year.

Composite box
1996 NLCS (4–3): Atlanta Braves over St. Louis Cardinals

The Cardinals were outscored 32-1 from Games 5-7.  The Braves +26 run differential for the entire series was the second largest in a postseason series.

Aftermath
Javy López was named the MVP for having a role in each Atlanta victory. In Game 1, he snapped a 2–2 tie with a two-run single; in Game 5, he hit a home run, two doubles, and scored four runs; in Game 6, he singled and scored after being hit by a pitch; and in Game 7, he went two for four with a double, a home run, three RBIs, and scored three runs. Overall, he batted a torrid .545 (13 for 24) with eight runs scored, five doubles, two home runs and six RBIs in the Championship Series. 

Game 7 was the last winner-take-all postseason game victory for the Braves. They have since lost six straight such games in 2002, 2003, 2004, 2012, 2019, and 2020.

After a bitter feud between Ozzie Smith and Tony La Russa that developed in spring training due to reduced playing time, Ozzie Smith announced his retirement on June 19, 1996, making Game 7 the last game of his 18-year career. Smith was elected to the National Baseball Hall of Fame in his first year of eligibility in 2002. He was also inducted into the St. Louis Cardinals Hall of Fame in the inaugural class of 2014.

At the age of 42, John Smoltz would throw his last pitch in professional baseball for the St. Louis Cardinals on October 10, 2009. After the Cardinals were bounced from the postseason by the Dodgers in the National League Division Series, Smoltz officially retired from baseball. Known as one of the best big game pitchers of his era, Smoltz was inducted into the Braves Hall of Fame in 2012 and was elected to the Baseball Hall of Fame in his first year of eligibility in 2015. 

The two teams met again three other times since 1996 in the postseason — during the 2000 National League Division Series, 2012 National League Wild Card Game, and 2019 National League Division Series — with the Cardinals winning all three match-ups.

References

External links
1996 NLCS at Baseball Reference

National League Championship Series
National League Championship Series
Atlanta Braves postseason
St. Louis Cardinals postseason
National League Championship
National League Championship
National League Championship Series
20th century in St. Louis
National League Championship Series